Michael Roe (born October 12, 1954) is an American, singer, songwriter, and record producer. He is a founding member of the band the 77s and the Lost Dogs and has recorded several solo albums.

Career
Although he has released several solo albums since the mid-1990s, Roe is primarily known as the lead singer and lead guitarist for the Christian alternative rock band the 77s. In addition to releasing albums under the moniker 7&7iS, he has recorded several instrumental albums with bandmate Mark Harmon. Roe is also a founding member of Lost Dogs.

Discography
Solo
 More Miserable Than You'll Ever Be, 7&7is (1989)
 Fun with Sound with Mark Harmon, 7&7iS (2004)
 RoesBuds (Fools of the World, 1994)
 Safe as Milk (Via, 1995)
 The Boat Ashore (Innocent Media, 1996)
 Safe as Milk Live – Cornerstone 1997 (Millenium Eight, 1999)
 Orbis with Mark Harmon (Fools of the World, 1999)
 Daydream with Mark Harmon (Fools of the World, 1999)
 Say Your Prayers (Fools of the World, 2002)
 All Day Sing and Dinner on the Ground with Terry Scott Taylor (Stunt/Fools of the World, 2003)
 We're All Gonna Face the Rising Sun (Lo-Fidelity, 2009)
 Michael Roe (Fools of the World, 2010)
 Kerosene Halo, with Derri Daugherty (2011)
 Guadalupe (Lo-Fidelity, 2014)
 Gimme a Kickstart ... and a Phrase or Two (Lo-Fidelity, 2014)
 Live in Torrance (Lo-Fidelity, 2014)
 Gothic  (2016)

With the 77s
 Ping Pong over the Abyss (Exit, 1982)
 All Fall Down (Exit, 1984)
 The 77s (Island, 1987)
 7&7is (a.k.a. More Miserable Than You'll Ever Be) (1989, 1990, 2014) 
 Sticks and Stones (Broken, 1990)
 Eighty Eight (Brainstorm Artists International, 1991)
 The 77s (a.k.a. Pray Naked) (Brainstorm, 1992)
 Drowning with Land in Sight (Myrrh, 1994)
 Tom Tom Blues (Brainstorm, 1995)
 Echos o' Faith (Fools of the World, 1996)
 EP
 A Golden Field of Radioactive Crows (Fools of the World, 2001)
 Fun with Sound (Fools of the World, 2004)
 Ninety Nine (Lo-Fidelity, 2007)
 Holy Ghost Building (Lo-Fidelity, 2008)
 Seeds and Stems (Lo-Fidelity, 2012)
 Misery Loves Company (Lo-Fidelity, 2014)
 Gimme a Kickstart ... and a Phrase or Two (Lo-Fidelity, 2014)
 Naked & Unashamed (2017)

With Lost Dogs
 Scenic Routes (1992)
 Little Red Riding Hood (1993)
 The Green Room Serenade, Part One (1996)
 Gift Horse (1999)
 Real Men Cry (2001)
 Nazarene Crying Towel (2003)
 MUTT (2004)
 Island Dreams (2005)
 The Lost Cabin and the Mystery Trees (2006)
 Old Angel (2010)

References

External links
 

1954 births
Living people
American performers of Christian music
Record producers from California
American rock guitarists
American male guitarists
American male singer-songwriters
American rock singers
American rock songwriters
Singer-songwriters from California
Guitarists from California
20th-century American guitarists
The 77s members
Lost Dogs members
The Swirling Eddies members
20th-century American male musicians